The term Interdict may refer to:

Religion

 Interdict,  an ecclesiastical penalty which temporarily bars a specific person or group of people from receiving the sacraments

Legal

 A court forbidding or enforcing a certain action, such as:
 Court order
 Injunction
 Interdicts in Scots law

Military

 Interdiction, to attack enemy resupply lines.
 Air interdiction, the use of aircraft to attack targets behind the front lines

sl:Interdikt